Jai Prakash (born 16 April 1958) is an Indian politician. He was elected as the Mohanlalganj (Lok Sabha Constituency) and Hardoi in Uttar Pradesh . He won Lok Sabha elections four times and was elected as a Rajya Sabha member.

External links
 Official biographical sketch in Parliament of India website

1958 births
Living people
People from Unnao
India MPs 2004–2009
Samajwadi Party politicians
Lok Sabha members from Uttar Pradesh
People from Sitapur district
India MPs 1999–2004
India MPs 1996–1997
India MPs 1991–1996
People from Hardoi district
India MPs 2019–present
Bharatiya Janata Party politicians from Uttar Pradesh